Scythris jemenensis is a moth of the family Scythrididae. It was described by Bengt Å. Bengtsson in 2002. It is found in Yemen.

References

jemenensis
Moths described in 2002